General Charles C. Krulak Stadium is located in Birmingham, Alabama, and serves as the home stadium for the Birmingham–Southern Panthers football, lacrosse, cross country, and track and field teams. The stadium has a maximum seating capacity of 1,600, and opened for the homecoming football game against Sewanee on November 8, 2008. The 49-0 Panthers victory saw an overflow crowd of 3,575 in attendance.

Panther Stadium serves as a replacement for the Munger Bowl, which was located on-campus and subsequently demolished in the 1960s to make way for campus expansion.

References

Birmingham–Southern Panthers football
College football venues
Sports venues in Birmingham, Alabama
2008 establishments in Alabama
Sports venues completed in 2008
American football venues in Alabama
Lacrosse venues in the United States
College track and field venues in the United States
College lacrosse venues in the United States